Heartkill is Norwegian singer Tone Damli's first extended play. The EP was released on 20 January 2014.

Track listing
 "Heartkill" - 3:23
 "Winner of a Losing Game" - 3:50
 "Perfect World" - 3:23
 "Smash" - 3:33
 "Hello Goodbye"  (featuring Erik Segerstedt)  - 3:09

Charts

Release history

References

2014 EPs
Tone Damli albums